
Gmina Dzierzążnia is a rural gmina (administrative district) in Płońsk County, Masovian Voivodeship, in east-central Poland.

Villages
Gmina Dzierzążnia contains the villages and settlements of Błomino Gumowskie, Błomino-Gule, Błomino-Jeże, Chrościn, Cumino, Dzierzążnia, Gumowo, Kadłubowo, Korytowo, Kucice, Niwa, Nowa Dzierzążnia, Nowe Gumino, Nowe Kucice, Nowe Sarnowo, Pluskocin, Podmarszczyn, Pomianowo, Przemkowo, Rakowo, Sadkowo, Sarnowo-Góry, Siekluki, Skołatowo, Starczewo Wielkie, Starczewo-Pobodze, Stare Gumino, Wierzbica Pańska, Wierzbica Szlachecka and Wilamowice.

Neighbouring gminas
Gmina Dzierzążnia is bordered by the gminas of Baboszewo, Bulkowo, Naruszewo, Płońsk and Staroźreby.

References

Polish official population figures 2006

Dzierzaznia
Płońsk County